Claude-Louis Châtelet, a French painter, was born in Paris in 1753. He produced Swiss views, sea-pieces, and pastoral scenes in the style of Vernet. Examples of his work are in the Orléans Museum, the Palace at Fontainebleau, and the Cottier Collection. He embraced with ardour the cause of the Revolution, allied himself with Robespierre and the leaders of the Jacobins, and became a member of the Revolutionary Tribunal. He was arrested some months after the 9th Thermidor, tried, condemned, and executed in Paris, May 7, 1795.

References
 

Jacobins
1753 births
1795 deaths
Painters from Paris
18th-century French painters
French male painters
French people executed by guillotine during the French Revolution
People of the Reign of Terror
18th-century French male artists